Jinfeng is a town under the administration of Jialing District, Nanchong, Sichuan, China. , it has two residential communities and 21 villages under its administration.

References 

Township-level divisions of Sichuan
Nanchong